Fred Claus is a 2007 American Christmas comedy film directed by David Dobkin, screenplay by Dan Fogelman and a story by Dan Fogelman and Jessie Nelson, and starring Vince Vaughn, Paul Giamatti, Miranda Richardson, John Michael Higgins, Elizabeth Banks, Rachel Weisz, Kathy Bates, and Kevin Spacey. The film was first announced in October 2005 with Mike Mitchell attached to direct. The film was released in the United States on November 9, 2007 by Warner Bros. Pictures. It is loosely based on the poem "A legend of Santa and his brother Fred" written by Donald Henkel. It received mixed to negative reviews from critics and grossed $97 million worldwide against the production budget of $100 million.

Plot
A baby is born, and within a few minutes of his birth he starts saying "Ho Ho Ho!". Mrs. Claus calls her son Fred over to meet his new baby brother whom she names Nicholas and lovingly refers to the baby as her little Saint Nick. A rift starts among the brothers when Nick cuts down a tree that Fred often climbed up to confide his problems in a bird. But Nick accidentally smashes the birdhouse it lived in which causes the bird to fly away.

In the present, Nick has become the modern-day Santa Claus, delivering gifts to the children of the world. Fred has become a repossession agent in Chicago. Fred lives alone and is friends with orphan Samuel "Slam" Gibbons. After his girlfriend Wanda breaks up with him, Fred is arrested for impersonating a Salvation Army employee in an attempt to raise seed money for an illegal casino plan. Fred asks Nick for bail and seed money. Nick gives him the bail money but will only give him the seed money if Fred comes to the North Pole to work and earn the money.

Head Elf Willie escorts Fred to the North Pole. Nick gives Fred the task of assigning children as "naughty" or "nice" based on their behavior. Efficiency expert Clyde Northcutt, from the agency which monitors the activities of supernatural entities, arrives to analyze the North Pole's dwindling performance on a three-strike assessment. Meanwhile, fed-up with the workshop's DJ Donnie playing nothing but "Here Comes Santa Claus", Fred enters Donnie's booth, stops the record, and tosses him into a cabinet. Nick, his wife Annette, and Northcutt enter the workshop to find Fred and the elves partying to Elvis Presley’s "Rubberneckin'", for which Northcutt gives Nick the first strike. Nick sandbags Fred into having dinner that evening with their parents (whom, to Nick's horror, have invited Northcutt).

Later that night, Northcutt shreds the children's letters. Fred is blamed for "losing" the letters, and the lack of backup copies leads to a second strike. Not believing Fred's denials, Nick has Security abduct Fred, and bring him to an intervention, attended by their parents, Annette, Wanda, and a psychologist. Angered by Fred's self-centeredness and his prodding about the man she gave a parking ticket to (which Fred witnessed via the workshop's Snow Globe), Wanda leaves. After also storming out of the intervention, Fred sees Slam on the top spot of the Naughty List: he realizes that Slam's bad behavior is a consequence of being bullied at the orphanage (along with some bad advice from Fred), and that Slam is a good kid. Fred then returns to his office, and assigns every child as "nice".

The brothers get into a fight over Fred's decision, with Nick injuring his back. Unable to now produce enough gifts for every good child, the North Pole falls far behind schedule, leading Northcutt to assign the third strike—shutting down the workshop. Fred leaves, taking his money and a gift from Nick. Back in Chicago, Fred attends a meeting with the siblings of other celebrities in an attempt to sort out his issues, then, after returning to his apartment, opens his gift: a replica of the birdhouse Chirp Chirp lived in and a note from Nick apologizing for cutting down the tree. With a change of heart, Fred uses the seed money to make his way back to the North Pole.

Fred motivates the elves to make as many gifts as possible in 10 hours. Because of his injury, Nick is unable to deliver gifts. Feeling guilty, Fred decides to deliver the presents (as only a Claus can deliver the gifts). He reminds Nick that most of the "naughty" kids aren't bad, but good kids going through bad situations, and that every child deserves a gift on Christmas. Fred gets the workshop to quickly make simple gifts so that every child gets a toy. Fred and Willie begin to deliver the gifts, but Northcutt sabotages their efforts and fires the elves. Nick realizes that Northcutt was also bullied as a child, which caused him to become troubled. Nick apologizes to Northcutt for putting him at the top of the Naughty List in 1968 and gives him the Superman cape he had asked for as a child.

Disguised as Santa, Fred visits Slam and gives him the dog he wanted for Christmas and tells Slam to become a better person. After every gift is delivered, Fred returns to the North Pole while Willie finally starts a relationship with the tall elf, Charlene. Fred and Nick make amends. Santa hires Northcutt to work at the North Pole. Slam is adopted. Fred reconciles with Wanda and takes her to Paris. The next Christmas, the Claus family is happily reunited including Chirp Chirp who now lives in the new birdhouse.

Cast
 Vince Vaughn as Frederick "Fred" Claus
 Jordon Hull as 6 year old Fred
 Liam James as 12 year old Fred
 Paul Giamatti as Nicholas "Nick"/"Santa" Claus
 Theo Stevenson as 6 year old Nick
 Miranda Richardson as Mrs. Annette Claus, Nick's wife.
 Kathy Bates and Trevor Peacock as Mother and Father Claus, Fred and Nick's parents. Peacock also serves as the narrator.
 Rachel Weisz as Wanda Blinkowski, Fred's girlfriend and a parking enforcement officer.
 John Michael Higgins as Willie, Nick's head elf whom Fred befriends and helps to hook up with Charlene.
 Elizabeth Banks as Charlene, a tall, blonde elf with whom Willie becomes enamored.
 Kevin Spacey as Clyde Archibald Northcutt, an efficiency expert who comes to assess the situation at the North Pole.
 Ludacris as DJ Donnie
 Jeremy Swift as Bob Elf
 Elizabeth Berrington as Linda Elf
 Bobb'e J. Thompson as Samuel "Slam" Gibbons, a young orphan boy that Fred mentors.
 Allan Corduner as Dr. Goldfarb
 Dylan Minnette, Justin McEwen, and Tyler Kelley as orphanage kids
 Jeffrey Dean Morgan (cameo) as unnamed man getting parking ticket.
 Frank Stallone, Roger Clinton Jr., and Stephen Baldwin as themselves at a Siblings Anonymous meeting Fred attends

Soundtrack
The music score is composed by Christophe Beck, but some of the tracks used are taken from the movie Mouse Hunt, composed by Alan Silvestri. In addition to his role, Ludacris performed a song called "Ludacrismas" for the film. The song also includes some interludes from "Here Comes Santa Claus". It also includes the 1969 Elvis Presley song Rubberneckin'.

Reception

Critical response
The website's critics consensus states: "A slew of talent is wasted in this contrived and overly sentimental Christmas film, which can't quite get the balance between slapstick humor and  schmaltzy uplift." On Metacritic it has a weighted average score of 42 out of 100 based on 31 critics, indicating "mixed or average reviews". Audiences polled by CinemaScore gave the film an average grade of "B" on an A+ to F scale.

Brian Lowry of Variety magazine said the film has many shortcomings but most of all Vaughn was miscast as his rapid-fire delivery and angry persona did not fit well with the story. Lowry describes it as following in the step of other feel-bad films, "movies so tone-deaf and disagreeable as to have completely worn out their welcome by the time that gush of last-act warmth arrives."

Box office
The film grossed $18,515,473 in its first weekend, and closed on February 14, 2008 with a final gross of $72,006,777 in North America and another $25,831,572 in other territories for a total worldwide gross of $97,838,349. The film became number 1 in the UK on its first weekend, bringing in £1.93m. It held the top spot for one week until it was surpassed by The Golden Compass.

Home media
The film was released on DVD and Blu-ray on November 25, 2008. The special features includes 25 minutes of deleted scenes and an audio commentary by director David Dobkin. The Blu-ray release includes a music video for "Ludacrismas" by Ludacris in High Definition and also a bonus disc entitled Fred Claus: Race to Save Christmas.

See also
 List of Christmas films
 Santa Claus in film

References

External links
 
 
 
 
 
 
 
 

2007 films
2000s adventure comedy films
2000s fantasy adventure films
2000s fantasy comedy films
American Christmas films
American adventure comedy films
American fantasy adventure films
American fantasy comedy films
American children's comedy films
American children's fantasy films
American Christmas comedy films
Films about brothers
Films about dysfunctional families
Films scored by Christophe Beck
Films based on poems
Films directed by David Dobkin
Films produced by Joel Silver
Films set in Chicago
Films set in Illinois
Films shot in Chicago
Films shot in Illinois
Films shot at Pinewood Studios
Films with screenplays by Dan Fogelman
Santa Claus in film
Silver Pictures films
Warner Bros. films
2000s Christmas films
2007 comedy films
2000s English-language films
2000s American films